A trampoline is a gymnastics and recreation device.

Trampoline may also refer to:

Music

Bands
 Trampolene (band), a British rock band

Albums 
 Trampoline (Steel Train album) (2007)
 Trampoline (The Confusions album) (2002)
 Trampoline (The Mavericks album) (1998), by alternative country group The Mavericks
 Trampoline (Joe Henry album) (1996)

Songs 
 "Trampoline" (Shaed song)
 "Trampoline" (Kero Kero Bonito song)
 "Trampoline" (Tinie Tempah song)
 "Trampoline" (Lazlo Bane song)
 "Trampolene", a song by Julian Cope from his album Saint Julian (1986)

 "Trampoline", by Hopsin from the album Raw (2010)
 "Trampoline", by Never Shout Never from his album Harmony (2010)
 "Trampoline", by the Spencer Davis Group from their album The Best of the Spencer Davis Group featuring Steve Winwood (1967)

Other uses
 Trampoline (advertising agency)
 Trampoline (computing)
 Trampoline (horse) (1825–?), thoroughbred racehorse
 Trampoline (multihulls), a part of multihull sailboats
 "Trampoline", an episode of The Good Doctor

See also
Trampolining